Upper Serangoon Constituency was a constituency in Upper Serangoon, Singapore from 1959 to 1980. In 1959, the constituency is formed by absorbing part of Serangoon and Paya Lebar constituencies.

Member of Parliament

Elections

Elections in the 1950s

Elections in the 1960s

Elections in 1970s

References
 https://www.nas.gov.sg/archivesonline/maps_building_plans/record-details/31abae25-014f-11e6-b6f6-0050568939ad

Singaporean electoral divisions
Serangoon
1959 establishments in Singapore